The year 1965 in television involved some significant events.
Below is a list of television-related events in 1965.

Events
January 1 – Comedian Soupy Sales, who hosted the "Lunch With Soupy Sales" children's program on New York City's WNEW-TV, encourages his young viewers to send him money ("those funny little green pieces of paper with pictures of U.S. presidents") from their parents' pants and pocketbooks and send them to him, and in return he would "send you a postcard from Puerto Rico!" Days later, when he actually got response, he declared that he was joking and that cash contributions would be donated to charity, but WNEW suspended Sales for two weeks over the incident.
February 22 – A new, videotaped production of the 1957 special Cinderella, by Richard Rodgers and Oscar Hammerstein II, airs on CBS with young Lesley Ann Warren (in the title role) starring alongside Ginger Rogers, Walter Pidgeon, and Celeste Holm.
March 11 – After months of speculation, Vivian Vance announces she is departing The Lucy Show following the conclusion of its third season. She would return to the series for guest appearances a few years later, a tradition that continued into Lucille Ball's following series, Here's Lucy.
March 24 – Live TV pictures from the US unmanned moon probe Ranger 9 are transmitted prior to its impact.
April 5 – TEN10 opens in Sydney, Australia, with the highlight of the opening night being the variety special TV Spells Magic.
April 15 – Paul Bryan (Ben Gazzara) gets bad news from his doctor and sets out to do all the things he never had time for, in the Kraft Suspense Theatre episode entitled "Rapture at Two-Forty."  This will serve as the pilot for the series Run for Your Life, which will premiere on September 13 and run until 1968.
April 21 – The Beach Boys appear on Shindig! performing their most recent hit, "Do You Wanna Dance?"
April 26 – Brazil's largest TV network, Rede Globo, begins broadcasting.
April 28 – My Name Is Barbra, Barbra Streisand's first TV special, airs on CBS.
May 2 – The Rolling Stones make their second appearance on The Ed Sullivan Show.
June 4 – The launch of the Gemini 4 space mission is broadcast in color by NBC. All three networks would carry the launch of Gemini 5 in color that August and all subsequent manned space launches.
July 31 - GTV (Ghana) began as GBC TV, making it the first television station in Ghana.
August 1 – Cigarette adverts are banned from UK television, though pipe tobacco and cigar adverts continue until 1992.
August 6 – BBC withdraws a planned airing of The War Game on BBC1's Wednesday Play anthology series; the network, officially, deems the film's depiction of a fictional nuclear attack on the United Kingdom and its aftermath as "too horrifying" to air on television, though it was widely believed that government pressure led to the banning.  The film would win the 1966 Academy Award for Documentary Feature, and BBC would not screen the film on-air until 1985.
September – ABC, CBS, and NBC, begin transitioning a majority of their prime-time programming towards color, with NBC virtually all their programming in color, and ABC and CBS over half of their programs, while keeping some of them in black-and-white due to production costs. 
September 10 – The first National Geographic Special, a chronicle of a 1963 U.S. expedition to Mount Everest, airs on CBS.
September 12 
NBC takes over telecasts of the American Football League, with most of the games being broadcast in color.
The Beatles appear on The Ed Sullivan Show for the fourth and final time, performing songs from their new album Help!.  This appearance was videotaped on August 14 before the group launched their U.S. tour the following night at Shea Stadium (Sunday, August 15, 1965).
September 13 – Today on NBC goes color.
October 4 – Pope Paul VI's visit to New York receives saturation television coverage on all three major American television networks. The Papal Mass at Yankee Stadium is broadcast in color.
October 17 – WBMG-TV in Birmingham, Alabama launches on channel 42, sharing dual CBS/NBC affiliation with crosstown WAPI-TV—and allowing viewers in the Birmingham market to watch more programming from those networks that WAPI did not have room for (including The Ed Sullivan Show, The CBS Evening News, and The Tonight Show).  The setup lasts until 1970, when WAPI takes sole affiliation with NBC and WBMG does the same with CBS.  At the same time, WCFT-33 in Tuscaloosa and WHMA-40 in Anniston become exclusive affiliates of CBS.  Like WBMG, Channels 33 and 40 were dual affiliates of NBC and CBS.
November 5 – Katie Holstrum (Inger Stevens) and Congressman Glen Morley (William Windom) are married in The Farmer's Daughter episode entitled "To Have and To Hold".
November 15 – The Huntley-Brinkley Report on NBC goes color on a regular basis, the first network evening newscast to be colorcast nightly.
November 25 – CBS airs the first color broadcast of an NFL football game, a Thanksgiving Day matchup between the Baltimore Colts and Detroit Lions.
November 28 – Julie Andrews' first TV special airs on NBC.
December 4 – TV Guide launches its Montana edition and now covers all of the contiguous U.S. (A Hawaii edition will be launched in 1968.)
December 9 – A Charlie Brown Christmas premieres on CBS.
December 21 – A production of The Nutcracker by the New York City Ballet airs on CBS.
Also in 1965
Sistema Nacional de Televisión (as TV Cerro Cora) began the first television broadcasts in Paraguay.
Three independently affiliated stations in the Philadelphia market—The "Other Big 3 in Philly"—start operations: WIBF (channel 29) opens on May 16; WKBS-TV (channel 48) opens on September 1 (and operates until 1983); and WPHL-TV (channel 17) opens on September 17.
 Motorola introduces the first successful rectangular tube color TV to the mass market.
 Jeopardy! moves to 12:00 noon on NBC, which would make the show a hit on the network for many years.

Programs/programmes
American Bandstand (1952–1989)
Another World (1964–1999)
Armchair Theatre (UK) (1956–1968)
As the World Turns (1956–2010)
Ben Casey (1961–1966)
Bewitched (1964–1972)
Blue Peter (UK) (1958–present)
Bonanza (1959–1973)
Bozo the Clown (1949–present)
Candid Camera (1948–present)
Captain Kangaroo (1955–1984)
Combat! (1962–1967)
Come Dancing (UK) (1949–1995)
Coronation Street (UK) (1960–present)
Crossroads (UK) (1964–1988, 2001–2003)
Danger Man (UK) (1960–1961, 1964–1966)
Daniel Boone (1964–1970)
Days of Our Lives (soap opera) (1965–present)
Dixon of Dock Green (UK) (1955–1976)
Doctor Who (UK) (1963–1989, 1996, 2005–present)
Face the Nation (1954–present)
Flipper (1964–1967)
Four Corners (Australia) (1961–present)
General Hospital (1963–present)
Get Smart (1965–1970)
Gidget (1965–1966)
Gilligan's Island (1964–1967)
Gomer Pyle, U.S.M.C. (1964–1970)
Grandstand (UK) (1958–2007)
Gunsmoke (1955–1975)
Hallmark Hall of Fame (1951–present)
Hogan's Heroes (1965-1971)
I Dream Of Jeannie (1965–1970)
I Spy (1965-1968)
It's Academic (1961–present)
Jeopardy! (1964–1975, 1984–present)
Jonny Quest (1964–1965)
Juke Box Jury (1959–1967, 1979, 1989–1990)
Love of Life (1951–1980)
Match Game (1962–1969, 1973–1984, 1990–1991, 1998–1999)
Meet the Press (1947–present)
Mister Ed (1961–1966)
My Three Sons (1960–1972)
Opportunity Knocks (UK) (1956–1978)
Panorama (UK) (1953–present)
Petticoat Junction (1963–1970)
Peyton Place (1964–1969)
Ready Steady Go! (1963–1966)
Run for Your Life (1965-1968)
Search for Tomorrow (1951–1986)
Shindig! (1964–1966)
The Addams Family (1964–1966)
The Adventures of Ozzie and Harriet (1952–1966)
The Andy Griffith Show (1960–1968)
The Avengers (UK) (1961–1969)
The Bell Telephone Hour (1959–1968)
The Beverly Hillbillies (1962–1971)
The Dean Martin Show (1965-1974)
The Dick Van Dyke Show (1961–1966)
The Doctors (1963–1982)
The Donna Reed Show (1958–1966)
The Ed Sullivan Show (1948–1971)
The Edge of Night (1956–1984)
The Flintstones (1960–1966) 
The Fulton Sheen Program (1961–1968)
 The Fugitive (1963–67)
The Good Old Days (UK) (1953–1983)
The Guiding Light (1952–2009)
The Hollywood Palace (1964–1970)
The Late Late Show (Ireland) (1962–present)
The Lawrence Welk Show (1955–1982)
The Lucy Show (1962–1968)
The Man from U.N.C.L.E. (1964–1968)
The Mavis Bramston Show (Australia) (1964–1968)
The Mike Douglas Show (1961–1981)
The Munsters (1964–1966)
 The Patty Duke Show (1963–1966)
The Saint (UK) (1962–1969)
The Secret Storm (1954–1974)
The Sky at Night (UK) (1957–present)
The Today Show (1952–present)
The Tonight Show Starring Johnny Carson (1962–1992)
The Wednesday Play (UK) (1964–1970)
This Hour Has Seven Days (1964–1966)
This Is Your Life (UK) (1955–2003)
Tom and Jerry (1965–1972, 1975–1977, 1980–1982)
Top of the Pops (UK) (1964–2006)
Truth or Consequences (1950–1988)
Walt Disney's Wonderful World of Color (1961–1969)
What the Papers Say (UK) (1956–2008) 
What's My Line (1950–1967)
Z-Cars (UK) (1962–1978)

Debuts 
January 2 – World of Sport on ITV in the UK with Eamonn Andrews as its first host (1965–1985)
January 2- Večerníček (Czechoslovakia)
June 28 – Dick Clark's Where the Action Is (1965-1967) on ABC daytime
September 12 – Hereward the Wake (1965) on BBC1
September 13 – Run for Your Life (1965-1968) on NBC
September 14
My Mother the Car (1965–1966) on NBC
Please Don't Eat the Daisies (1965–1967) on NBC
September 15 
Lost in Space (1965–1968) on CBS
Green Acres (1965–1971) on CBS 
The Big Valley (1965–1969) on ABC
Gidget (1965–1966) on ABC 
I Spy (1965–1968) on NBC
September 16 – The Dean Martin Show (1965–1974) on NBC
September 17 – The Wild Wild West (1965–1969) and Hogan's Heroes (1965–1971) on CBS
September 18 – I Dream of Jeannie and Get Smart on NBC (both 1965–1970)
September 19 – The F.B.I. (1965–1974) on ABC
September 27 
Morning Star (1965-1966) on NBC 
Paradise Bay (1965-1966) on NBC
September 30 – Thunderbirds on the ITV channel (1965–1966)
November 8 – The soap opera Days of Our Lives on NBC (1965–present)
December 20 – game shows Supermarket Sweep (1965–1967) and The Dating Game (1965–1973) on ABC daytime
Quentin Durgens, M.P. (1965–1969)
United! on BBC1 in the UK (1965–1967)
The White Horses as Počitnice v Lipici on RTV Ljubljana in Yugoslavia and as Ferien in Lipizza on Südwestfunk in West Germany (c.1965–1967)

Ending during 1965

Changes of network affiliation

Births

Deaths

See also
 1965–66 United States network television schedule

References